The House of Drakos-Soutzos or Soutsos (or ) is a Greek Phanariote family originally from Chios,  which grew into prominence and power in Constantinople (present-day Istanbul) during the last centuries of Ottoman Empire and gave several hospodars to the Danubian Principalities, like Alexandros Soutzos, Mihai Suțu  and Michael Soutzos (Mihail Suțu).

History 
The origins of the Soutzos family are unclear. Some authors theorize Albanian, or Byzantine Greek descent for the family.

Konstantinos Drako, son of a rhetor of the patriarchate (Diamantaki Drako), was the man who was first Soutzos to rise to prominence. He married in 1714 princess Maria Rusetaina, daughter of a long-established Phanariote family (her mother was Helena Mavrokordataina and her paternal grandfather Antonie had under Ottoman overlordship even held the princely rule in the Danubian countries). Konstantinos'  in-laws raised Konstantinos to high positions in Danubian principalities, and his sons were kin with everybody who mattered in Phanar. Later, in 1780s..1790s, one of the sons (Mihai Draco-Sutzu) rose to the thrones of Walachia and Moldavia and was the first Prince of their surname.

After prince Mihai, his nephew Alexandru Suțu, and his namesake grandson Mihail Suțu also ruled as Princes.

Significant members of the family include the two brother poets Panagiotis Soutsos and Alexandros Soutsos, of whom the first set the cornerstone for the revival of the Olympic Games and the latter was the founder of the Greek Romantic school of poetry. The main branch of the above family is found now in Athens, Greece. Alexandru A. Suțu and Mihail C. Suțu both became members of the Romanian Academy in the 1880s.

References
Alexandre Negresco-Soutzo (ro), Livre d’Or de la Famille Soutzo, chez l'auteur, Paris, 2005.

 
Greek noble families
Greek families
Romanian people of Greek descent
Phanariotes